Phang Nga (officially Phangnga) may refer to

Phang Nga town
Phang Nga Province
Phang Nga district
Phang Nga Bay
Phang Nga River